Thornhill Grammar School was a school between Thornhill, West Yorkshire and Dewsbury. 
The building is dated 1643 and now disused. It was built with money
bequeathed by Charles Greenwood, Rector of Thornhill. The rear part
was built as a copy in 1884. It is a grade II listed building.

References

Grade II listed buildings in West Yorkshire
Grade II listed educational buildings
Defunct schools in Kirklees
Schools in Dewsbury